These are statistics for the first season of the Suomensarja held in 1938.

Overview
The 1938 Suomensarja  was contested by 26 teams divided into 4 regional sections. The top teams from each section then participated in a promotion play-offs with Reipas Viipuri eventually gaining promotion andfinishing as champions.

League tables

Itäsarja, Eteläinen lohko (Eastern League, Southern Section)

Itäsarja, Pohjoinen lohko (Eastern League, Northern Section)

Länsisarja, Eteläinen lohko  (Western League, Southern Section)

Länsisarja, Pohjoinen lohko (Western League, Northern Section)

Nousukarsinnat (Promotion Playoffs)

Semi-finals

Finals

Reipas Viipuri were promoted and KIF Helsinki were required to undertake a further round of playoffs.

Mestaruussarja/Suomensarja promotion/relegation playoffs

KIF Helsinki remained in the Suomensarja and KPT Kuopio were not relegated from the Mestaruussarja.

See also
Mestaruussarja (Tier 1)

References

Suomensarja
2
Fin
Fin